Enga Margaret Washbourn (1 March 1908 – 8 July 1988) was a notable New Zealand artist and writer. She was born in Collingwood, New Zealand, in 1908.

References

1908 births
1988 deaths
New Zealand artists
New Zealand writers
People from Collingwood, New Zealand
People educated at Nelson College for Girls